VSF may refer to:

Victorian Soccer Federation
Video Services Forum
Virginia Science Festival